Heinz Günthardt defeated Peter Elter in the final, 6–4, 7–5 to win the boys' singles tennis title at the 1976 Wimbledon Championships.

Draw

Finals

Top half

Section 1

Section 2

Bottom half

Section 3

Section 4

References

External links

Boys' Singles
Wimbledon Championship by year – Boys' singles